Lachnocnema congoensis is a butterfly in the family Lycaenidae. It is found in the south-western part of the Republic of the Congo.

References

Endemic fauna of the Republic of the Congo
Butterflies described in 1996
Taxa named by Michel Libert
Miletinae